Carl Fenton was a pseudonym of Walter G. Haenschen, American bandleader, composer, and radio musician.

Name origin 
The Carl Fenton Orchestra (AKA "Carl Fenton’s Orchestra") was a title given to Brunswick Records studio bands through the 1920s. The name was invented by Brunswick music director Walter Gustave "Gus" Haenschen shortly after taking the position for their brand-new American division.  Later, the name was taken by violinist Ruby (Rubin) Greenberg.

Haenschen, whose own name was considered ill-suited for commercial recordings, haphazardly chose the name "Fenton" after the town of Fenton, Missouri, near his hometown of St Louis, Missouri. He attended Washington University in St. Louis. He told an interviewer "How do you find a name? Just pull it out of a hat." The first name "Carl" was likely selected by Brunswick's office staff.

Early recordings 
The earliest songs recorded by Carl Fenton's Orchestra were Karavan and Romance, from October 1919. Brunswick Records released many "Carl Fenton" records, with various line-ups of musicians. The band was typically led by Haenschen in the studio, but was led by studio musician/conductor Rubin "Ruby" Greenberg during their occasional concerts.

Orchestra change 
Around the time that Haenschen left Brunswick Records in mid-1927, Greenberg purchased the rights to the Carl Fenton name. From 1928 to 1930, Greenberg was musical director for Gennett Records, where he recorded as "Carl Fenton’s New Yorkers". Under the direction of Greenberg, the Carl Fenton Orchestra then moved to radio, where they co-starred with a young Bing Crosby from 1931 to 1932 on the CBS network (on tour the orchestra was named "Cremo Orchestra" after sponsor Cremo Cigars).

In 1932, Greenberg had his name legally changed to Carl Fenton. He continued to work as a music director for radio and theaters until his death in January 1942.

Sources 
 Carl Fenton
 Gus Haenschen

References

External links
 W. Gus. Haenschen recordings at the Discography of American Historical Recordings.

American bandleaders
American radio personalities
Washington University in St. Louis alumni
Gennett Records artists
Musicians from St. Louis
Year of birth missing
Year of death missing